Wasan (和讃) is a type of Japanese Buddhist hymn.

Wasan may also refer to:
, a distinct kind of mathematics developed in Japan during the Edo period (1603–1867)
Kampong Wasan, a village in Brunei
Wasan Important Bird Area, Brunei

See also 
 Wassan